Mou Jinxiang is a Chinese businesswoman who is the former chairwomen of Lianhe Chemical Technology, a pesticide and chemical producer based in Taizhou, China.

Mou is a billionaire. She co-founded Lianhe Chemical Technology in 1985. In 2015, Mou's wealth increased to over a billion dollars based on Lianhe Chemical Technology's increased profits.

In 2016, Mou was recognised by Forbes as one of the most powerful businesswomen in Asia.

References 

Living people
Chinese business executives
20th-century Chinese businesswomen
20th-century Chinese businesspeople
21st-century Chinese businesswomen
21st-century Chinese businesspeople
Year of birth missing (living people)